Chakravarthy Ramachandra is an Indian film producer, who has worked on Hindi, Tamil and Telugu-language films. After beginning his career as an independent producer, he later joined YNOT Studios as its CEO.

Career

Early career
After completing a diploma at the London Film Academy in 2005, Chakravarthy Ramachandra debuted in the film industry as a supporting actor in the Telugu comedy film Mr. Errababu (2005), where he also doubled up as the film's line producer. In December 2005, Ramachandra launched his first production through the Ideaz Production banner with Shashank and Rajeev Kanakala selected for the lead roles. The project, directed by another debutant named Chakravrathy, was later dropped.

He continued working in the technical crew of Telugu films, notably serving as the line producer in Sukumar's Arya 2 (2009), Walt Disney Pictures's Anaganaga O Dheerudu (2011) and Oosaravelli (2011), and developed his knowledge of film-making. Ramachandra was then set to make his debut as a co-producer with Sukumarudu (2013), but later opted out of the venture. He later set up his own production house, Bad Monkey Productions, to produce the Telugu and Tamil comedy films Antha Scene Ledu and Nondi Kuthirai (2014) starring Navdeep and Shashank.

Work with YNOT Studios
Ramachandra first became involved with YNOT Studios during the release of Kadhalil Sodhappuvadhu Yeppadi in Telugu as Love Failure. His work on the film as an executive producer paved way for him to join YNOT Studios' other projects. After working as the executive producer of Guru (2017) and Vikram Vedha (2017), Ramachandra became the company's chief executive officer and in the late 2010s, he co-produced films such as Tamizh Padam 2 (2018) and Game Over (2019) alongside the studio's founder S. Sashikanth.

As the company approached its tenth anniversary, Ramachandra oversaw the company's collaboration with Reliance Entertainment to co-produce several of their projects, and the announcement of their subsidiaries: its distribution arm, YNOT X and the music label YNOT Music. In the early 2020s, the company alternated between producing high-budget projects featuring leading actors and technical crew, and making small-budget content-driven films featuring relative newcomers. Big-budget productions such as Jagame Thandhiram (2021) and the Hindi version of Vikram Vedha (2022), were complemented by a number of smaller ventures with "off-beat" scripts including Halitha Shameem's Aelay (2021), Madonne Ashwin's Mandela (2021), Nishanth Kalidindi's Kadaseela Biriyani (2021) and Jayaprakash Radhakrishnan's Thalaikoothal (2023).

Personal life
Ramachandra married Pooja at the Taj Deccan, Hyderabad on 23 August 2013.

Filmography

As a freelance producer

Films produced with YNOT Studios

Films acted

References

Footnotes

External links

Living people
Tamil film producers
Telugu film producers
Hindi film producers
Film producers from Chennai
Film producers from Hyderabad, India
1978 births